Laser Inc was a two-person Swedish Eurodance band. The band's single "Det var en gång en fågel" became a hit in Sweden and Finland in the summer of 2007, reaching a peak of number six on the Swedish charts during a 15-week run, and 11 in two weeks on the Finnish charts. The duet's members were Jonas, the singer and songwriter, and Robin (or Raaban, full name Robbin Söderlund), who was the music producer.

The band also included Izko (Chainkickerz), who performed a Russian dance, and he was also helping to produce the music, but left prior to the band's break-up. The band was signed to Warner Music Sweden. Although the band are all still friends, they split up to assume solo careers.

Raaban (Robbin) has established a career as a house producer under the pseudonym "Brilliant". He was also a part of the production duo Tungevaag & Raaban.

Discography

Singles
(Selective)

Others
 Dansa tills ni svimmar
 Fiske Eliten 
 Sola och bada
 Festen är Igång
 Abraham
 Utgång ikväll
 När man var liten
 Vill ha dej (Freestyle cover)

Albums

Roger That!
Roger That! is the first studio album by Swedish eurodance band Laser Inc. It was released on May 4, 2009 under the Warner Music Sweden Label. The 12 track album includes their hit single "Det var en gång en fågel". The lyrics are primarily in Swedish with a few English phrases included in the album.

Track listing

References

External links 
Laser Inc Myspace page

Swedish electronic music groups
Swedish Eurodance groups